Cup Fever is a 1965 British family sports film under the banner of the Children's Film Foundation. It was directed by David Bracknell and starred Bernard Cribbins and David Lodge. The film includes early appearances from Susan George and Olivia Hussey.

Plot
A youth football team are ejected from their playing field on a waste ground, and struggle to find another place to train for a cup semi-final. Thanks to a friendly policeman, they spend a day training with professionals at Manchester United, including George Best, Bobby Charlton and Denis Law. Despite sabotage from the opposing team, they go on to win the final and are presented with their cup by Manchester City goalkeeper Bert Trautmann.

Cast
 Bernard Cribbins - Policeman
 Sonia Graham - Mrs. Davis
 Dermot Kelly - Bodger the bootmender
 David Lodge - Mr. Bates
 Johnnie Wade - Milkman
 Norman Rossington - Driver
 Rex Boyd - himself
 Ruth Holden - herself
 Bud Ralston - himself
 Rex Deering - himself
 Matt Busby - Himself
 Denis Law - Himself
 Bobby Charlton - Himself
 Nobby Stiles - Himself
 David Herd - Himself
 Pat Dunne - Himself
 Jack Crompton - Himself
 George Best - Himself
 John Connelly - Himself
 Pat Crerand - Himself
 Tony Dunne - Himself
 Bill Foulkes - Himself
 Shay Brennan - Himself
 Bert Trautmann - Himself
 Susan George - Vicky Davis
 Olivia Hussey - Jinny

References

External links

1965 films
British association football films
Children's Film Foundation
Films set in Manchester
British children's films
1960s children's films
1960s sports films
Films shot in Greater Manchester
1960s English-language films
1960s British films